Concord Speedway was a motorsports facility located in the town of Midland, North Carolina, southeast of Concord, North Carolina. The complex featured a -mile asphalt tri-oval and a -mile asphalt oval.

The complex was built in 1982 by Henry Furr, originally with the big track as a dirt -mile oval. The track was later paved, and then reconfigured in 1991 as a -mile tri-oval. The primary divisions for the half-mile shifted between Super Late Models, and Late Model Stock Cars.

The small track was built first as a -mile layout for go-kart racing in the mid to late 1980s, the track was reconfigured to add a 1/4-mile asphalt oval layout in the mid '90s – the bigger layout featured was loosely egg shaped around the -mile oval – this layout traditionally hosted INEX Legends & INEX Bandoleros as the primary weekly division.

The half-mile track was especially known for the Big 10 Series for Super Late Models, and the North-South Shootout event (featuring multiple divisions – the marquee being a 125-lap Tour-type Modified race).

The track closed in July 2019, and was sold to Copart.

History

Precursor
In total, there were 3 tracks under the Concord Speedway name, this facility being the third.

The first track  to use the Concord Speedway moniker was built in the 1950s and was built off of Poplar Tent Rd. – located at the end of Old Speedway Dr. NW, this track held seven NASCAR Grand National (now known as the NASCAR Cup Series) events between 1956 and 1959. The track was left abandoned after the closure.

The second track was also built off of Poplar Tent Rd. (located near Eva Drive & Channing Circle) – also in the 1950s. This track was a -mile dirt oval, and also was named Harris Speedway, Concord International Speedway & New Concord Speedway throughout its history. NASCAR held five Grand National races between 1962 and 1964. This track ran throughout the 1970s, it hosted the debut season of the National Dirt Racing Association – which was won by Rodney Combs on May 26, 1979. The NDRA race was also the final race at the Eva Dr. facility.

Both properties of the first 2 tracks are now housing developments.

However, it wasn't the first track to be built in Concord or Cabarrus County. The first track in Concord was called the Concord Fairgrounds, and was located off of Highway 29 at the former Cabarrus District Fairgrounds. This half mile dirt oval facility was originally built for horse racing, and was first used for auto racing in 1925. The track ran until 1934 & also hosted 2 AAA Contest Board Sprint Car races (1931 & 1934). Other notable tracks in the county include famed Charlotte Motor Speedway complex, the Midland Dustbowl - which held racing from 1948 to the 1950s, Twin City Speedway (in Kannapolis) - which held stock car racing on a 1/4 mile dirt oval up to 1964  and Two Flags Speedway (off of Gold Hill Rd.) - which hosted Micro Sprints & Go-Kart racing from 1976 to 1997.

Results

Fairgrounds (1924–1932)

AAA Sprint Cars
1932 - Johnny Sawyer
1934 - Floyd Davis

Poplar Tent Road location (1949–1959)

NASCAR Grand National
NASCAR held 7 Grand National races on the original dirt half mile located on Old Speedway Drive (near Poplar Tent Road) in Concord.
1956 - Speedy Thompson
1957 (race 2) - Marvin Panch
1957 (race 5) - Jack Smith
1957 (race 51) - Fireball Roberts
1958 - Lee Petty
1959 (race 5) - Curtis Turner
1959 (race 44) - Jack Smith

NASCAR Convertible Series
NASCAR held one Convertible Series race on the original dirt half mile.
1957 - Curtis Turner

Eva Drive location (1949–1979)

NASCAR Grand National
- NASCAR held 5 Grand National races on the second dirt half mile track located off of Eva Drive (near Popular Tent Road) in Concord. The main entrance driveway for the track is now called Speedway Drive, and is a part of a housing complex.
1962 (race 1) - Jack Smith
1962 (race 6) - Joe Weatherly
1962 (race 20) - Joe Weatherly
1964 (race 1) - Ned Jarrett
1964 (race 29) - Richard Petty

USAC Stock Car
United States Auto Club held two stock car races at the second facility in 1961 and 1963. Both races were 200 lap affairs.
 1961 - Don White
 1963 - Bill Cheesbourg

National Dirt Racing Association
- NDRA held a single race on the second dirt 1/2 mile track in 1979.
1979 (May 26) - Rodney Combs

A new beginning

The current track was built by race promoter Henry Furr in 1982, Furr was looking to build a track following the sale of the previous 1/2 mile dirt track that he promoted. The track was originally a four-tenths of a mile oval, it hosted 3 races for the NDRA dirt late model touring series in 1983 - including the season finale, those were won by Larry Moore (July 4), dirt modified ace Kenny Brightbill (September 3) & Mike Duvall (October 8th). The first few years, the track featured no walls on the outside corners, those were added in by 1984 or 1985.

Pavement era

Furr paved the track in August 1986, the track was reconfigured in 1991, adding a true dog-leg to the backstretch.  The track now is a half-mile with three unique turns, all with unique banking. The shape of the new layout was similar to Pocono Raceway, and Sanair Super Speedway. Pit road entrance is located in the tri-oval prior to turn three, grandstand seating held over 12,000 fans.

The track started the Big 10 Series for Super Late Models in 1987, Jack Sprague won the first series title. The series became very popular with the fans, as it was highly competitive.

David Laton purchased the track following the 1996 season. The Big 10 Series didn't return in 1997 for the first season under new ownership & Late Model Stock Cars became the main weekly championship of the half-mile. Laton made several capital improvements to the facility including a repave (done in 1999), replaced barriers & fencing, a Hubbell lighting system & several fan amenities. Grandstand seating was also downsized, as most of the Alan Kulwicki Grandstand became a dirt berm, with only the portion near the turn 1 gate staying intact - being replaced with metal bleachers.

The track brought back the Super Late Models for the Big 10 Series in 2003, the championship lasted until 2005. Freddie Query is the track's all-time leader in wins and claimed the Big 10 series championship in 2004 and 2005.

Late Model Stock Cars returned as the main track championship, until 2009 when the track added Pro Late Models to the weekly card.

One of the track's more popular events, the North South Shootout was started in 2003 at the half-mile tri-oval. The event featured a 125-lap race for Tour-type Modifieds, along with several other marquee divisions such as Supermodifieds & the ARCA/CRA Super Series. The event stayed at Concord until 2010, it was originally going to move to Myrtle Beach Speedway for 2011 - however Caraway Speedway hosted the annual event following the death of original race promoter Charles Kepley.

Half Mile uncertainty & revival

The track stopped weekly racing on the half-mile tri-oval in 2012, only the quarter-mile oval has hosted weekly racing since. The quarter-mile weekly program features INEX Legends, INEX Bandoleros, along with Davis Mini Cups, go-karts, and quarter midgets on select nights. The quarter-mile traditionally featured racing from March to May, and August to early October – with a 2-month break in June and July. Previously, this layout also featured USAC Speed2 Eastern Midgets during the summer months (2008–2010).

In 2015, racing returned to the half-mile tri-oval after not hosting any touring series for the past 2 years, the opening event featured the PASS South Super Late Models and Koma Unwind Modified Madness Series running on Memorial Day weekend.

That season also saw the return of the North-South Shootout event in November. Alongside the John Blewett III Memorial 125 for the Tour-type Modifieds, other touring series such as the PASS South Super Late Models were a part of the event. CARS Tour also returned that year – now in the dual series format for Super Late Models & Late Model Stock Cars. CARS Tour ran for 3 seasons until the end of 2017.

On May 5, 2018, the track hosted the Minimizer Bandit Big Rig Series. Defending series champion Ricky Rude got the lead on lap #6 & won the A-main feature.

Closure

On January 9, 2019, North-South Shootout promoter Darren Hacket announced that the event would move away from the facility to Hickory Motor Speedway due to the uncertain future of the Concord Speedway complex.

The track would continue to host the INEX Legend Cars & INEX Bandoleros on the quarter-mile track.

On July 2, 2019, it was announced that the track would be sold, and that leaders in each of the weekly series point standings would be awarded championship trophies for the year. The buyer was later reported to be Copart.

Notable competitors
Winners and competitors at the track include Greg Pope, Freddy Query, Dale Earnhardt Jr., Jack Sprague, Ernie Irvan, Bobby Labonte, Denny Bennet, Justin Labonte, Clay Rogers, Jimmy Simpson, Bobby Gill, Dale Earnhardt Sr., Bobby Measmer Jr., Ryan Preece, Buster Bennet, Jeff Melton, Sonny Schoffen, Kenny Brooks, Shane Huffman and Josh Hogan

Statistics
The park consists of two tracks: a -mile tri-oval and a -mile oval. Originally the -mile oval was a -mile oval and the -mile was added later. The -mile is still there but only used for Davis Mini Cups and quarter midgets. The tri-oval seats 8,500 fans with room for 28 RVs, while the 1/4 mile track seats 2,050.  Additionally, the track has several air-conditioned suites located behind the main grandstand.

The track is active as a site for the filming of several television commercials, television shows, movies, and music videos.

Events

Former touring series & events (half-mile)
ALL PRO Super Series (1987)
Allison Legacy Race Series (1997, 2004, 2006–2008, 2010–11, 2017–18)
ARCA/CRA Super Series - Southern Division (2010)
ASA National Tour (2001, 2003)
ASA Late Model Series - Southern Division (2008–09)
Hooters Pro Cup Series 1998-2008
CARS Late Model Stock Tour (2015-–2017)
CARS Super Late Model Tour (2015–2017)
CARS Pro Cup Series (1998–2000, 2002–2011)
ISMA Supermodifieds (1993)
ISCARS Dash Touring Series (2010)
KOMA Unwind Modified Madness Series (2015)
Lucas Oil Pro Pulling League
Mid-Atlantic Limited Late Model Series (2016)
Mid-Atlantic Street Stock Championship (2015–2016, 2018)
Minimizer Bandit Big Rig Series (2018)
NASCAR
NASCAR Goodys Dash Series (1989–1990, 1997–1998)
NASCAR AutoZone Elite Division, Southeast Series (1997–1998)
NASCAR Whelen Southern Modified Tour (2009, 2016)
NDRA Stroh's Pro National Series (1983)
Pro All Stars Series
PASS South Super Late Model Series (2007, 2012, 2015–2017)
PASS Pro Late Model Series (2015)
PASS Super Limited Late Models (2012)
PRA Tours
602 Modified Tour (2017)
602 Super Limiteds Tour (2017 & 2018)
Southern Modified Racing Series (2016–2018)
Rolling Thunder Modifieds (2007, 2010)
SMART Modified Tour (1991, 1998–1999, 2002–2004)
Southern All Star Asphalt Series (1998)
Southern Outlaw Street Stock Tour (2016)
UARA STARS Late Model Series (2007–2012)
USAC Racing
USAC AMSOIL National Sprint Car Championship (2006)
USAC NOS Energy National Midgets (2006)
USAC Speed2 Eastern Midgets (2006)
USCS Outlaw Thunder Tour (2001–2002, 2005)
Virginia Mini Cups (2002–2005)
BIG 10 Super Late Model Series (1987–1996, 2003–2005)
North South Shootout (2003–2010, 2015–2018)
Tour-type Modifieds - John Blewett III Memorial 125 in memory of Charles Kepley (2003–2010, 2015–2018)
PRA 602 Super Limited Tour (2018)
PRA 602 Modified Tour (2018)
Street Stocks (2008, 2015–2016, 2018)
Mini Stocks (2015–2018)
PASS South Super Late Models (2015–2017)
SK Modifieds (2005–2010, 2015–2017)
Limited Late Models (2015–2017)
Chargers (2017)
Mid-Atlantic Limited Late Model Series (2016)
Southeastern Super Trucks (2015)
Vintage Modifieds / Sportsman / Flatheads (2003–2010, 2015–2016)
CRA Super Series - Southern Division (2010)
USA Modifieds (2010)
TBARA Sprint Cars (2009)
Supermodifieds (2007–2008)
SK Light / Crate Modifieds (2006–2007)
Four Cylinders (2006–2007)
Pro 4 Modifieds (2006)
Late Model Stock Cars (2004)
INEX Thunder Roadsters (2004–2005)
Pro Trucks (2003)

Former touring series & special events (quarter-mile)
USAC Racing
USAC Speed2 Eastern Midgets (2008-2012)
USAC Speed2 Eastern Midgets - Young Guns (2010 & 2011)
Carolina Asphalt Racing Kart Series (-2006)
 North South Shootout (2006)
USAC Speed2 Eastern Midgets
Mini Stocks
INEX Legends

Former weekly divisions (half-mile)
Late Model Stock Cars (−2012)
Street Stock (2012)
Fast & Furious 4's (2007–2012)
Vintage Sportsman (2012)
Sportsman (2012)
Pure Stock (2003–2011)
Pro Late Model (2009 & 2010)
Thunderstox (2010)
INEX Thunder Roadsters (2009)
Limited Late Models (2004–2008)
Super Late Models (1987–1996, 2003–2005)
Mini Stocks (–2005)
Hornets (–2005)
Limited Stock Cars (–2003)
Pro Trucks (–2003)
X-Cars (2001–2002)
Road Hawgs
Super Stocks

Former weekly divisions (quarter mile)
INEX WIX Filters Legends Cars (–2019) – (Young Lions/Semi-Pro/Pro/Masters)
INEX Bandoleros (–2019) – (Beginners Bandits/Bandits/Outlaws)
Davis Mini Cups
Go-karts
Quarter midgets

Note: data only goes back to 2001

Results

North South Shootout
the North South Shootout was held 12 times at Concord, with the marquee race being the Tour-type Modified - John Blewett III Memorial 125 in memory of Charles Kepley. Other divisions of the event included: ARCA/CRA Super Series, PASS South Super Late Models, Supermodifieds, SK Modifieds, Vintage cars & other regional divisions from the east coast.

Tour-type Modifieds

Super Late Models

ASA National Tour
ASA held two ASA National Tour races on the paved half mile.
2001 - Johnny Sauter
2003 - Davin Scites

CARS Tour
CARS Tour held races on the paved half mile with the CARS Pro Cup Series (then USAR Pro Cup) between 1998 & 2011, and the current dual series format for Super Late Models & Late Model Stock Cars between 2015 & 2017.

NASCAR Whelen Southern Modified Tour
NASCAR held two Whelen Southern Modified Tour races on the paved half mile, and the SMART Modified Tour (precursor to the Whelen Southern Modified Tour) also held 6 races at the track.

PASS South Super Late Models
PASS held 10 races at Concord between 2007 & 2017.

UARA STARS
UARA STARS Late Model Series held 9 races at the half-mile track from 2007 to 2012.

Track Champions

Half Mile Track

Big 10 Series (Super Late Models)
 1987 - Jack Sprague
 1988 - Larry Raines
 1989 - Jack Sprague
 1990 - Robbie Faggart
 1991 - Rich Bickle
 1992 - Rich Bickle
 1993 - Freddie Query
 1994 - Freddie Query
 1995 - Mike Thomas
 1996 - Eddie Massengill
 2003 - Eddie Massengill
 2004 - Freddie Query
 2005 - Freddie Query

Pro Late Models
 2009 - Cooper Faassen
 2010 - Colt James

Late Model Stock Cars
 1988 - Freddie Query
 1989 - Jack Sprague
 1990 - Freddie Query
 1991 - Freddie Query
 1992 - Freddie Query
 1993 - Greg Pope
 1994 - Jack Sprague
 1995 - Greg Pope
 1996 - Lance Moss
 1997 - Mike Herman Jr.
 1998 - Mike Herman Jr.
 1999 - Kevin Love
 2000 - Kevin Love
 2001 - Kevin Love
 2002 - Chris Beach
 2003 - Shaun Mangum
 2004 - Todd Bardburry
 2005 - Travis Sharpe
 2006 - Shane Brafford
 2007 - Chuck Crump
 2008 - Kevin Love
 2009 - Steve Ackerly
 2010 - Jay Payne
 2011 - Bobby Measmer Jr.
 2012 - Kenny Brooks

Late Model Sportsman
 1997 - Terry Brooks

Limited Late Models
 2004 - Terry Brooks Jr.
 2005 - Terry Hoggard
 2006 - Ben Hinson
 2007 - Bobby Measmer Jr.
 2008 - Mike Terry

Pro Truck
 2000 - Jeremy Moore
 2001 - Roger Lee Newton
 2002 - Terry Brooks Jr.
 2003 - Terry Brooks Jr.

Limited Stock
 2001 - Kenneth Cook
 2002 - Jeff Melton
 2003 - David Kepley

Pure Stock
 2003 - Mark Harris
 2004 - Luke Nickels
 2005 - Brian Love
 2006 - Steve Irvin
 2007 - Ben Smith
 2008 - Charles Hutto
 2009 - Jeff Melton
 2010 - Jeff Melton

Street Stock
 1997 - Dave Berry
 1999 - Mike Glover

Fast & Furious Fours
 2007 - Tracy Mullis
 2008 - Chad Miller
 2009 - Wayne Harrington
 2010 - Chad Miller

Mini Stocks
 1997 - David Pennell.                                                    1998- Randy Freeze
 2001 - Jeff Whitley
 2002 - Roy Maness
 2003 - Randy Freeze
 2004 - Adam Beaver
 2005 - David Pennell

Hornets
 2002 - Mark Harris
 2003 - Mark Harris
 2004 - Chad Miller
 2005 - Bobby Measmer Jr.

Thunderstox
 2010 - Rusty Drye

INEX Thunder Roadsters
 2004 - Matt Lassiter
 2005 - Kyle Beattie
 2009 - Adam Welch

X-Carz
 2001 - Guy Bacelo
 2002 - Junior Cress

In popular culture
Concord was noted for being used as a filming & production location, especially within the racing industry given the close proximity to most NASCAR teams.

Some of the notable movies & shows filmed at the facility included: 3: The Dale Earnhardt Story & Shaq Vs. (as the opening show of season 2 where Shaquille O'Neal held a match race with NASCAR star & former Concord regular Dale Earnhardt Jr.)

Many commercials were filmed at Concord as well, among the companies & brands that used the track included: Allstate, AAA Insurance, Blimpie, Coors Light, ESPN, Gilette, National Guard, Mountain Dew, Pizza Hut, TBS (promotion featuring country music duo Brooks & Dunn for the Coca-Cola 600 in 1998) & Wrangler Jeans.

Among video games, Concord was included in several video games. Most notably of those is iRacing.com - which was one of their first tracks that the group laser scanned in 2005. The track is currently a part of iRacing's base content package. It was also featured in the USAR Hooters Pro Cup game by Infogrames (released in 2002 for the PC).

Among modding circles for various PC racing games, it was also recreated for several Papyrus NASCAR games such as NASCAR Racing 2003 Season, and also for NASCAR Heat.

Concord was also used for some inspiration for a fictional track in several NASCAR console games by EA Sports. The fictional track - called Levi Strauss Signature Speedway debuted in NASCAR 2005: Chase for the Cup

References

 Plemmons, Mark (July/August 2009) Family-friendly, "grassroots racing" is going on all summer long at Concord Speedway. Cabarrus Living Magazine, p. 12.

External links
 Official Website
Concord Speedway archive at Racing-Reference

Sports venues in Cabarrus County, North Carolina
Motorsport venues in North Carolina
Concord, North Carolina
Tourist attractions in Cabarrus County, North Carolina
1982 establishments in North Carolina
Sports venues completed in 1982
NASCAR tracks